Hugo Filipe Santos Guedes (born 25 October 1993), known as Moedas, is a Portuguese footballer who plays for Folgosa Maia Futebol Clube as a midfielder.

Club career
Born in Matosinhos, Moedas joined local Leixões SC's youth system in 2003. He made his professional debut in the 2012–13 season, with the club in the second division.

In the 2014–15 campaign, Moedas scored four goals all competitions comprised, all coming through penalty kicks and three being in the league. In the summer of 2015, after 12 years at the Estádio do Mar, he signed with fellow league team U.D. Oliveirense.

External links

1993 births
Living people
Sportspeople from Matosinhos
Portuguese footballers
Association football midfielders
Liga Portugal 2 players
Segunda Divisão players
Leixões S.C. players
U.D. Oliveirense players
C.D. Estarreja players
R.D. Águeda players
F.C. Maia players
Portugal youth international footballers